The history of quilting, the stitching together of layers of padding and fabric, may date back as far as 3400 BCE.
For much of its history, quilting was primarily a practical technique to provide physical protection and insulation. However, decorative elements were often also present, and many quilts are now primarily art pieces.

Europe

In Europe, quilting appears to have been introduced by Crusaders in the 12th century (Colby 1971) in the form of the aketon or gambeson, a quilted garment worn under armour which later developed into the doublet, which remained an essential part of fashionable men's clothing for 300 years until the early 1600s.

One of the earliest existing decorative works is the Tristan Quilt, made around 1360 in Sicily. It is one of the earliest surviving quilts in the world and at least two sections survive, located at the V&A Museum (London) and in Bargello palace (Florence). Another of the Tristan and Isolde story is held in a private collection.

Russia
The oldest surviving example of a quilted piece is a linen carpet found in a Mongolian cave, dated to between 100 BCE and 200 CE. It is now kept at the Saint Petersburg department of the Russian Academy of Sciences, Archaeology Section.

United Kingdom (and colonial Australia) 
The National Gallery of Australia has a  quilt known as the Rajah Quilt. It was created by about 30 convict women as they were transported from Woolwich, England to Hobart, Tasmania in 1841. The quilt was rediscovered in Scotland in 1989. It is a medallion quilt with Broderie perse at its centre.

United States
Quilt making was common in the late 17th century and early years of the 18th century. Colonial quilts were not made of leftover scraps or worn clothing as a humble bedcovering during this period but were decorative items that displayed the fine needlework of the maker, such as the Baltimore album quilts. Only the wealthy had the leisure time for quilt making, so such quilting was done by only a few. Commercial blankets or woven coverlets were a more economical bedcovering for most people.

Whole cloth quilts, broderie perse and medallion quilts were the styles of quilts made during the early 19th century, but from 1840 onward the use of piecework and blocks, often made from printed fabric, became much more common.

Quilting is now a popular hobby, with an estimated base of twenty-one million quilters.

Wholecloth quilts
Early wholecloth bed quilts which may appear to be a solid piece of fabric are actually composed of strips of fabric, since early looms could not produce widths of cloth large enough to cover an entire bed surface. Early quilts that feature the same fabric for the entire quilt top, whether that top is made of dyed wool or pieces of (the same) printed cotton fabric, are referred to as wholecloth quilts. Early wholecloth quilts have three layers: a quilt top, a filling (in early quilts the filler was often wool), and a backing. The three layers are held together via quilting stitches worked by hand, in an age before sewing machines were marketed. In wholecloth quilts, the quilting stitches themselves serve as the only decoration. The earliest whole cloth quilts found in America were brought from Europe. Initially, quilts were owned by the wealthy in America who had the means to purchase imported quilts.

The collection of the Lovely Lane Museum in Baltimore, Maryland contains a quilt believed to have been carried onshore by the Cogswell family who embarked from Bristol, England en route to Bristol, Maine in 1635. Once the passengers were safely on shore, the galleon "Angel Gabriel", moored in Pemaquid Bay, was completely destroyed when the Great Colonial Hurricane of 1635 rushed up the coast from Naragansett, Rhode Island, leaving the ship as just a mass of floating debris after it was hit with the strongest winds ever recorded.

The Canton Historical Society in Canton, Massachusetts believes that a wholecloth quilt in their collection may be the oldest wholecloth quilt made in America. The wool wholecloth quilt was made in 1786 by Martha Crafts Howard.

The Buckingham Quilt surfaced in 2014. It was made by the wife of Reverend Thomas Buckingham, one of the founders of Yale University, and passed down through nine generations. It is among the oldest wholecloth quilts made in America (circa 1660s).

A more complete survey is needed to compare all of the wholecloth quilts held in the many museum locations who have collected such textiles. Many early quilts did not survive the test of time or were discarded, or if they survived, the name of the quilter was lost to history. For a time, the trend in wholecloth quilting was a preference for all-cotton white quilts. 

Many of the beautiful surviving wholecloth quilts feature feather designs, outlines of flowers, or are based on other designs taken from nature motifs. Some were made even more exquisite by the use of stuffed and corded quilting, a method sometimes called trapunto. Trapunto is an Italian word used to describe the technique of slipping extra stuffing into certain areas of a quilt to create areas of raised motifs that stand in relief. For example, stuffing placed inside the quilted outline of a feather or flower makes the design stands out. Women were sometimes proud of their finely wrought and evenly spaced quilting stitches in their wholecloth quilts. This type of quilting seems to be experiencing a revival today and some quilt stores sell pre-marked quilt tops ready to be layered and quilted, either by hand or by machine.

Broderie perse quilts
Broderie perse refers to the technique of cutting motifs from printed fabric and appliquéing them onto a solid background. This form of quilt making has been done since the 18th century. The popular printed fabric during this period was chintz imported from India.

Printed fabric was expensive even for those who were well off. By cutting out birds, flowers and other motifs from printed fabric and sewing them onto a large homespun cloth, a beautiful bedspread could be made. The technique was also used on some early medallion quilts as in the example.

Broderie perse bedcoverings were usually used on the best bed or sometimes only when guests were staying in the home.

Medallion quilts

Medallion quilts are made around a center. The center was sometimes a solid piece of large-scale fabric like a toile or a Tree of Life, an appliqued motif or a large pieced star or other pieced pattern. The central area was surrounded by two or more borders. Although some borders were solid, many were pieced or appliqued.

Mid-19th century
Changes came about as progress in technology deeply affected the number and styles of quilts made during the middle years of the 19th century.

The Industrial Revolution brought about the most dramatic change as textiles came to be manufactured on a broad scale. This meant women no longer had to spend time spinning and weaving to provide fabric for their family's needs. By the 1840s the textile industry had grown to the point that commercial fabrics were affordable to almost every family. As a result, quilt making became widespread.

A great variety of cotton prints could be bought to make clothing and even specifically for making a quilt. Although scraps left over from dressmaking and other sewing projects were used in quilt making, it is a myth that quilts were always made from scraps and worn-out clothing. Examining pictures of quilts found in museums we quickly see that many quilts were made with fabric bought specifically for that quilt.

Another major shift was in the style of quilts made. Although a few earlier quilts were made in the block style, quilts made up of blocks were uncommon until around the 1840s. With so many fabrics being manufactured quilters could create their blocks with a delightful variety of fabrics.

Some block style quilts were made of a set of identical pieced blocks while others contained a variety of blocks made with different patterns. The blocks were sewn together and a border may or may not have been added.

During this period the invention and availability of the sewing machine contributed to quilt making. In 1856, the Singer company started an installment plan so that more families could afford a sewing machine. By the 1870s, many households owned a sewing machine.

This affected quilt making in two ways. First of all, women could make clothing for their family in much less time, which left more time for quilt making. Secondly, they could use their sewing machines to make all or part of their quilts. The sewing machine was usually used to piece quilts, but occasionally the quilting itself was done with the sewing machine.

Civil War era

Leading up to the American Civil War, quilts were made to raise funds to support the abolitionist movement then during the war, quilts were made to raise funds for the war effort and to give warmth and comfort to soldiers. The patterns were much like those made mid-century but the purpose was different. Quilts connected to the abolitionist movement and the Civil War were made for a cause, many representing the relevant flag.

Abolition and the role of quilts
Even before 1830, abolitionists were working hard to end slavery. One way they did this was to hold grand fairs to raise both awareness and money for the abolitionist cause. Quilts were one of many craft pieces sold at these fairs. These quilts were usually fine quilts often with beautiful appliqué. Women sometimes put anti-slavery poems and sayings on the quilts they made for fairs as well as for friends and family. The goal was to show the terrible plight of the slaves.

Some abolitionists were active along the Underground Railroad and helped runaway slaves get to safety. There is a popular myth that maintains that certain quilts were used as signals to help slaves in their flight to freedom. For example, a log cabin quilt might be hung on the line of a safe house. However, historians dispute the accuracy of these stories. In fact, the only reference for these underground railroad quilts is a single book (Hidden in Plain View by JACQUELINE L. TOBIN and RAYMOND G. DOBARD) written over 120 years after the war.  Nevertheless, the myth caught fire and can be found in children's books, teacher's lesson plans, and quilter's pattern books; it seems loath to die.

For the troops

Women on both sides were very active in raising money for the war effort and making quilts and other bed coverings for soldiers.

In the North, quilts were still made for fairs but now these fairs earned money to support needs that came about because of the war. In the South, "gunboat" quilts were made to pay for much-needed gunboats.

It wasn't long before it was obvious that soldiers on both sides would need blankets and quilts for warmth. In the North, women either made quilts or remade quilts from bed coverings. Since the cots were narrow, two bedspreads could be made into three quilts for soldiers. The United States Sanitary Commission was in charge of collecting and distributing them.

In the South, quilt-making was more difficult because although cotton was grown in the south, it was manufactured into fabric in the north. Before long, fabric was almost impossible to obtain so women had to spin and weave before they could sew a bed covering together. Regardless of their construction, most of the quilts made for soldiers on either side were made with practical patterns and fabric. Due to heavy use, very few have survived to the 21st century.

Victorian era America
Quilt making continued to be a popular craft during the latter part of the 19th century. The English Victorian influence was slightly delayed in the United States because of the Civil War and its aftermath.

Amish quilting

Amish quilts are appreciated for their bold graphic designs, distinctive colour combinations, and exceptional stitching. Quilting became a favoured activity of the Anabaptist sect after emigrating to the United States and Canada from Germany and Switzerland over 250 years ago. The earliest known Amish quilts, dating from 1849, are whole-cloth works in solid colours. Pattern-pieced bed coverings didn't appear until the 1870s. Particular patterns and fabrics are identified with specific Amish communities; for example, pre-1940s quilts from Lancaster County were almost always made of wool while those sewn in Ohio during the same period were commonly made of cotton.

Often these quilts provide the only decoration in a simply furnished home and they also were commonly used for company or to show wealth. Amish religion discourages individual expression but quiltmaking has allowed Amish women to express their creative natures without giving offence. The Amish communities have always encouraged activities that promote community and family closeness so quilting became a fundamental part of social life for the women of the community. Quilts are created for everyday use or to celebrate special occasions such as birthdays, weddings, raising funds for the church or community cause. Since the "English" (the name for non-Amish people) discovered Amish work in the late 1960s, quilting has become a source of income for many. Their quilts have become collectors' items all over the world.

Crazy quilting fad
In terms of quilts the latter years of the 19th century are best remembered for the "Crazy quilting" craze. Crazy quilts were made of abstract shapes sewn randomly together. Usually the quilt maker then used embroidery to embellish the quilt. Fancy stitches were sewn along the seams and often, embroidered motifs were added, including flowers, birds and sometimes a spider and web for good luck. Magazines encouraged making "crazies". These simple, organic quilts were seldom used as bed-coverings, instead they were made smaller and without batting to be used as decorative throws.

Traditional quilt survival
Because crazy quilting was so popular at the time, they tend to eclipse the fact that many traditional quilts were also made for bedding and commemoration. Utilitarian quilts were pieced and tied or simply quilted for everyday bed coverings while beautiful pieced and/or appliquéd quilts were created for special events like a wedding or when a beloved minister was transferred to a new location. These were more often elaborately quilted.

In the 1940s and 1950s many farm feeds were delivered in sacks. These sacks were printed with all sorts of designs. Feed sacks were used to make thousands of quilts.

Contemporary quilts
Contemporary quilting has evolved to include a broad range of functional, decorative and artistic styles that incorporate ever-expanding techniques and tools. Many quilters have experimented with creating or dyeing their own fabrics, incorporating experimental materials into their designs and conceptually challenging the notion of what quilting is or should be. Advances in technology such as long-arm quilting machines and computer programs for mapping quilt top patterns and colour schemes has significantly widened the gap between contemporary and traditional quilting. There is currently a thriving resurgence in quilting. Thousands of videos of quilting techniques and tutorials have been made and shared online by people from around the world, continuing the tradition of quilting as a social and artistic space where people have connected over countless generations

See also

 Duvet
 List of quilters
 NAMES Project AIDS Memorial Quilt
 Patchwork quilt
 Quilt art
 Razai
 Southern AIDS Living Quilt
 Tessellation

References

Further reading

Primary sources

Books

Articles

External links

 Who Invented Quilting?
 Where Did Quilting Originate?
 Baltimore Album quilts at the Maryland Historical Society
 The American Quilt Study Group
 America's Quilting History
 New Pathways Into Quilt History
 Quilt History
 The Quilt Index
 Quilt Study Groups
 Quilter's Muse Publications
 The Buckingham Quilt

Quilting
quilting